Kirgizemys is an extinct genus of turtle from Early Cretaceous of China, South Korea, Mongolia, Russia and Kyrgyzstan.

References
 Danilov, I. G.; Averianov, A.O.; Skutchas, P.P. & Rezvyi, A.S. 2006. Kirgizemys (Testudines: Macrobaenidae): New material from the Lower Cretaceous of Buryatia (Russia) and taxonomic revision. pp. 46–62 in I. G. Danilov & J. F. Parham (eds.), Fossil Turtle Research, Vol. 1.
 Parham, J.F. & Hutchison, J.H. 2003. A new eucryptodiran turtle from the Late Cretaceous of North America (Dinosaur Provincial Park, Alberta, Canada). J. Vertebr. Paleontol. 23 (4): 783–798.
 Shukanov, V.B. 2000. Mesozoic turtles of Middle and Central Asia. pp. 309–367 in M. J. Benton, M. A. Shishkin, D. M. Unwin, and E. N. Kurochkin (eds.), The Age of Dinosaurs in Russia and Mongolia. Cambridge University Press, Cambridge.

Early Cretaceous turtles
Macrobaenidae
Early Cretaceous reptiles of Asia
Cretaceous China
Prehistoric turtle genera
Extinct turtles